Middlesbrough West was a parliamentary constituency in the town of Middlesbrough in North East England.  It returned one Member of Parliament (MP) to the House of Commons of the Parliament of the United Kingdom, elected by the first-past-the-post voting system.

The constituency was created for the 1918 general election, and abolished for the February 1974 general election.

Boundaries 
1918–1950: The County Borough of Middlesbrough wards of Acklam, Ayresome, Cannon, Cleveland, Linthorpe, and Newport.

1950–1955: The County Borough of Middlesbrough wards of Acklam, Ayresome, and Linthorpe, and the Borough of Thornaby.

1955–1974: The County Borough of Middlesbrough wards of Acklam, Ayresome, Crescent, Gresham, Linthorpe, Park, and Whinney Banks, and the Borough of Thornaby.

Members of Parliament

Election results

Elections in the 1910s 

 Thomson was issued with the Coalition Coupon but rejected it.

Elections in the 1920s

Elections in the 1930s

Elections in the 1940s 
General Election 1939–40:

A General election was due to take place before the end of 1940, but was postponed due to the Second World War. By 1939, the following candidates had been selected to contest this constituency;
Liberal: Frank Griffith
National Labour: Thomas K. Briggs

Elections in the 1950s

Elections in the 1960s and 1970s

See also 
 1940 Middlesbrough West by-election
 1945 Middlesbrough West by-election

References 
 Boundaries of Parliamentary Constituencies 1885–1972, compiled and edited by F.W.S. Craig (Parliamentary Reference Publications 1972)

Parliamentary constituencies in North East England (historic)
Constituencies of the Parliament of the United Kingdom established in 1918
Constituencies of the Parliament of the United Kingdom disestablished in 1974
Politics of Middlesbrough